June Kreuzer is a former member of the Ohio House of Representatives.

External links
Profile on the Ohio Ladies' Gallery website

References

Democratic Party members of the Ohio House of Representatives
Cleveland State University alumni
Women state legislators in Ohio
People from Parma, Ohio
Living people
1944 births
21st-century American women